Vertientes is a municipality and town in the Camagüey Province of Cuba.

Demographics
In 2004, the municipality of Vertientes had a population of 53,299.

See also
Municipalities of Cuba
List of cities in Cuba
Vertientes Municipal Museum

References

External links

Cities in Cuba
Populated places in Camagüey Province